Matías Alberto Grandis (born 15 September 1985) is an Argentine footballer who currently plays for Deportes Copiapó.

Career
Born in Oliva, Córdoba, Grandis began playing football in the youth systems of Club Atlético Lanús and Club Atlético Atlanta. He started his professional career in Chile, playing for Deportes Naval, Curicó Unido, Audax Italiano and Unión La Calera, before returning to Argentina. In 2018, he joined Italian Serie D side F.C. Francavilla with his brother Tomás.

References

External links
 
 

1985 births
Living people
Argentine footballers
Argentine expatriate footballers
Primera B de Chile players
Chilean Primera División players
Club Atlético Atlanta footballers
Naval de Talcahuano footballers
Unión La Calera footballers
Curicó Unido footballers
Deportes Copiapó footballers
Expatriate footballers in Chile
Association football midfielders